African-American dance has developed within various spaces throughout African-American communities in the United States, rather than studios, schools, or companies. These dances are usually centered on folk and social dance practice, though performance dance often supplies complementary aspects to this. Placing great value on improvisation, these dances are characterized by ongoing change and development. There are a number of notable African-American modern dance companies using African-American cultural dance as an inspiration, among these are the Whitey's Lindy Hoppers, Alvin Ailey American Dance Theater, Dance Theatre of Harlem,and Katherine Dunham Company. Hollywood and Broadway have also provided opportunities for African-American artists to share their work and for the public to support them.

History 
After the start of the slave trade in the 1500s, Africans brought their dances to North, Central, and South America, along with the Caribbean islands.

Development during slavery 
The Greater Chesapeake area encompassing Virginia, Maryland, and much of North Carolina was the earliest and perhaps most influential location of the black-white cultural interchange that produced "African-American" dance. Given their cultural differences, particularly with music and dance, they most likely learned to dance together by creating brand-new dances to draw on their traditions without replicating them precisely. Elements of European dances were also absorbed into these creolized dances, and by the late 18th century, the area had developed a recognizable dance style.

The limited pictorial record indicates that the original African movements, which emphasized bending at the waist and hips, eventually faded away in favor of a more upright style, similar to European dances. However, it has been argued that this change was not an adoption of the European style, but actually reflected the African practice of carrying heavy loads on the head, which requires a straight, upright spine. Black dancing continued to reflect other African characteristics such as angularity and asymmetry of body positions, multiple body rhythms or polyrhythms, and a low center of gravity.

Katrina Thompson found that the evolution of black music and dance emphasizes dance as a form of release. In some instances, slaveholders forced slaves to sing and dance to entertain them while they worked. The act of singing and dancing for themselves thus became an act of reclamation. The cakewalk, for example, developed on plantations as a subtle mockery of the formal, mannered dancing practiced by slaveholding whites. The slaves would dress in handed-down finery and comically exaggerate the poised movements of minuets and waltzes for their own amusement. A 1981 article by Brooke Baldwin concludes that the cakewalk was meant "to satirize the competing culture of supposedly 'superior' whites. Slaveholders were able to dismiss its threat in their own minds by considering it as a simple performance which existed for their own pleasure".

New York City and the Harlem Renaissance 

Just as the Harlem Renaissance saw the development of art, poetry, literature and theater in Harlem during the early 20th century, it also saw the development of a rich musical and dance life: clubs (Cotton Club), ballrooms (Savoy Ballroom), the home rent party and other black spaces as the birthplaces of new dances, theaters and the shift from vaudeville to local "shows" written and choreographed by African-American artists; theaters as public forums for popularizing African-American cultural dances. 

During this time voguing was a very popular thing in an event called ball. Ball culture was a way for black people to come together mostly LGBTQ+ and black women to show off and feel like a star or have a chance to be seen. Paris Is Burning (film) is a great documentary about ball culture and who started it and you see it through the eyes of the mothers( leaders of the drag houses) and how they started and how they came to be and the culture of them.

Performance, competition and social dance 

Competition has long played an important role in social dance in African and African-American social dance, from the "battles"' of hip hop and lindy hop to the cakewalk. Performances have also been integrated into everyday dance life, from the relationship between performance and social dancing in tap dancing to the "shows" held at Harlem ballrooms in the 1930s.

Social dance spaces 

 Juke joint, street parties, rent party and the importance of the front porch
 Ballrooms, cabaret clubs and church halls

Competitive dance 

 Cakewalks
 The Harvest Moon Ball
 Breakdance
 Lindy Hop

Tradition 

In most African-American dance cultures, learning to dance does not happen in formal classrooms or dance studios. Children often learn to dance as they grow up, developing not only a body awareness but also aesthetics of dance which are particular to their community. Learning to dance – learning about rhythmic movement – happens in much the same way as developing a local language 'accent" or a particular set of social values.
Children learn specific dance steps or "how to dance' from their families – most often from older brothers and sisters, cousins or other older children. Because cultural dance happens in everyday spaces, children often dance with older members of the community around their homes and neighborhoods, at parties and dances, on special occasions, or whenever groups of people gather to "have a good time". Cultural dance traditions are therefore often cross-generational traditions, with younger dancers often "reviving" dances from previous generations, albeit with new "cool" variations and "styling". This is not to suggest that there are no social limitations on who may dance with whom and when. Dance partners (or people to dance with) are chosen by a range of social factors, including age, sex, kinship, interest and so on. The most common dance groups are often comprised by people of a similar age, background and often sex (though this is a varying factor).

Cultural expression 

Lee Ellen Friedland and other authors argue that to talk about cultural dancing  without talking about music or art or drama is like talking about fish without talking about water. Music and dance are intimately related in African-American cultural dance, not only as accompaniments, but as intertwined creative processes.

"African American Cultural Dance" was a description coined by National Dance Association author and researcher Frank R. Ross, who correctly replaced the old stereotyped "vernacular" (native or natural) definition of African-American dance with its correct definition as "cultural" (sanctioned by the National Dance Association and International Dance Council).

Some of the popular African-American dances of today are the Detroit Ballroom and Social – Chicago Steppin & Walking, D.C. Baltimore, Hand Dance, Calypso & The NAACP Sanctioned Grand March – National Black Wedding & Reunion Dance. Popular black dance organizations are perfectly paired Gentlemen of Ballroom of Cleveland Master Dancers of Akron, OH. Dance Fusion, World Class-Detroit, Majestic Gents – Chicago Smooth & Easy D.C. Tri – State – Love to dance – Sugarfoot of Baltimore, MD.  The new American dance art form of African-American cultural dance and music was accepted into the New York City Schools dance education curriculum.

Jacqui Malone describes the relationships between tap dancers who traveled with bands in the early 20th century, describing the way tap dancers worked with the musicians to create new rhythms. Much has been written about the relationship between improvisation in jazz and improvisation in jazz dance – the two are linked by their emphasis on improvisation and creative additions to compositions while they are in process – choreography and composition on the spot, in a social context – rather than a strict division between "creation" and "performance", as in the European middle class ballet and operatic tradition. African Dance is supposed to be about a person getting connected to the ground and telling their story and struggles using dance. It also allows people to feel the vibrations of their dance beneath their feet, allowing them to dance how they please, utilizing the space that they have so they can express themselves freely.

It is equally important to talk about the relationship between DJs MCs, b-boys and b-girls and graffiti artists in hip hop culture, and John F. Szwed and Morton Marks have discussed the development of jazz and jazz dance in America from European set dances and dance suites in relation to the development of musical artisanship.

African-American modern dance 

African America modern dance blends modern dance with African and Caribbean movement (flexible torso and spine, articulated pelvis, isolation of the limbs, and polyrhythmic movement). Notable people included:
Katherine Dunham (1909–2006) trained in ballet, founded Ballet Negre in 1936 and then the Katherine Dunham Dance Company based in Chicago. In 1945, she opened a school in New York City, teaching Katherine Dunham Technique, African and Caribbean movement integrated with ballet and modern dance.
Pearl Primus (1919–1994), born in Trinidad, drew on African and Caribbean dances to create strong dramatic works characterized by large leaps. She often based her dances on the work of black writers and on racial issues, such as Langston Hughes's 1944 The Negro Speaks of Rivers, and Lewis Allan's 1945 Strange Fruit (1945). Her dance company developed into the Pearl Primus Dance Language Institute.
Alvin Ailey (1931–1989) studied under Lester Horton, Bella Lewitzky, and later Martha Graham. He spent several years working in both concert and theater dance. In 1958, Ailey and a group of young African-American dancers performed as the Alvin Ailey American Dance Theater in New York. He drew upon his "blood memories" of Texas, the blues, spirituals and gospel as inspiration. His most popular and critically acclaimed work is Revelations (1960).
Eleo Pomare (1937–2008)  was born in Columbia, but moved to New York as a child, and later founded the Eleo Pomare Dance Company. With Carole Johnson, Rod Rodgers, Gus Solomon and Pearl Reynolds, he co-founded the Association of Black Choreographers, which was the predecessor to the Modern Organization for Dance Evolvement, or MODE. His work had a profound impact on many dancers and choreographers, including Indigenous Australians.
Carole Johnson (born 1940) danced with Pomare's company, contributed to the definition of "Black Dance", and leaves a huge legacy in Australia in the form of the NAISDA Dance College and Bangarra Dance Theatre.

African-American sacred and liturgical dance 

Dance was and is an integral part of West African communal religious expression. This tradition, to the extent permitted by slave holders, continued in the antebellum worship of slaves and other African Americans. One example was the ring shout in the early church. Dancing, especially as a group, became less frequent when African Americans joined more liturgical denominations such as Methodist and Catholic but was more likely maintained in Holiness, Baptist and Pentecostal churches. Individuals often rose to dance when moved to do so. Since the 1970s, liturgical dance has become more accepted as and element of worship even among Methodist and other liturgical churches. The black consciousness movement of the 1960s and 1970s as well as efforts by groups such as The Sacred Dance Guild  fostered this dance form, which draws on modern dance and jazz dance. Since the late 1980s gospel mime, in which texts and lyrics are acted out, has found some acceptance in black churches.

Genres by period

Pre-19th century 

 Buck dance
 Patting juba
 Stick dance (African-American)

19th century 

Dance genres:

 Tap dancing
 Cakewalk
 Set de flo'

1920s through 1940s 

Dance genres and moves:

 Swing
 Lindy hop
 Charleston
 Texas Tommy
 Jitterbug

1950s 
 Stepping
 The Bus Stop
 The Stroll

1960s 

Music genres:

 Funk
 Northern Soul
 Motown
 Rapping
 Adult African-American Dance

Dances and moves:
 Set de flo'
 Monkey
 James Brown
 The Twist
 Strand
 Hand dance
 Detroit Social

1970s 

Music genres:

 Disco
 Go-go
 Hip-hop music
 Minneapolis sound
 Philadelphia soul
Dance genres and moves:

 Boogaloo
 Popping
 Locking
 The Robot
 The Worm
Electric Slide

1980s and 1990s 

Music genres:

 Rap (+ beatboxing)
 House music
 New jack swing
 Pop rap

Dance genres and moves:

 Break-dancing
 Hip Hop
 Moonwalk
 Hammertime
 Voguing
 Crip Walk
 Primetime
 Cabbage Patch
 Running Man
 Chicago stepping
 Detroit Ballroom
 Gangsta Walking

2000s and 2010s 

Music genres:

 Crunk
 Trap music

Dance genres and moves:

Krumping
Turfing
Jerkin'
Harlem shake (popularized in the 2000s)
Cat Daddy
Dougie
Jookin
Twerking, part of a larger set of moves unique to the New Orleans style of hip hop known as "bounce", especially post- 
Dab
Milly Rock
Whip and Nae Nae
Hit the Quan
The Shmoney Dance
Stanky legg

See also 

 African-American culture
 African-American history
 African-American music
 Dance in the United States
 Modern dance in the United States
 Get down
 Jazz dance
 Hip-hop dance
 Street dance
 African dance

References

Further reading 
 deFrantz, Thomas. Dancing Many Drums: Excavations in African-American Dance. Wisconsin: University of Wisconsin Press, 2002.
 Emery, Lynne Fauley. Black Dance in the United States from 1619 to 1970. California: National Press Books, 1972.
 Glass, Barbara S. African American Dance. McFarland & Company, 2007. .
 Gottschild, Brenda Dixon. Digging the Africanist Presence in American Performance. Connecticut and London: Greenwood Press, 1996.
 Hazzard-Gordon, Katrina. "African-American Vernacular Dance: Core Culture and Meaning Operatives." Journal of Black Studies 15.4 (1985): 427–45.
 Hazzard-Gordon, Katrina. Jookin': The Rise of Social Dance Formations in African-American Culture. Philadelphia: Temple University Press, 1990.
 Jackson, Jonathan David. "Improvisation in African-American Vernacular Dancing." Dance Research Journal 33.2 (2001/2002): 40–53.
 Malone, Jacqui. Steppin' on the Blues: The Visible Rhythms of African American Dance. Urbana and Chicago: University of Illinois Press, 1996.
 Stearns, Marshall, and Jean Stearns. Jazz Dance: The Story of American Vernacular Dance. 3rd edn. New York: Da Capo Press, 1994.
 Szwed, John F., and Morton Marks. "The Afro-American Transformation of European Set Dances and Dance Suites." Dance Research Journal 20.1 (1988): 29–36.
 Welsh-Asante Kariamu. "African-American dance in curricula: modes of inclusion" (Pathways to Aesthetic Literacy: Revealing Culture in the Dance Curriculum) American Alliance for Health, Physical Education, Recreation and Dance (AAHPERD) (July 28, 2005)
 Welsh-Asante Kariamu. The African Aesthetic: Keeper of the Traditions (Contributions in Afro-American & African Studies), Greenwood Press, 1993.
 Welsh-Asante Kariamu. African Culture the Rhythms of Unity: The Rhythms of Unity Africa World Press, 1989.

External links
 Discussion of the roots of African-American social dance with demonstrations. Duke University.

 
Dance in the United States
Dance
Articles containing video clips